Diriangén was a native Nicaraguan king who controlled land from Diriamba in Carazo to the Ochomogo river in Rivas, outside the boundaries of Nicarao's kingdom. It is possible that Diriangen belonged to the Chorotega[es] people.

Etymology 
Diriangén was a portmanteau of the words Dirian ("people of the hills") — the tribe that he ruled — and gen, an honorific title in the Oto-Manguean languages.

Biography

Early life 
Diriangén was born in 1497. His mother encouraged him to learn swordsmanship and war tactics throughout his childhood.

Rebellion 
Spanish explorer Gil González Dávila had arrived in Nochari in April of 1523 with a fleet of soldiers, with whom he converted the Nahuatl people of Ochomogo, Gotega, Mombacho, Morati, and Nandapia to Catholicism. In response to this, Diriangén arrived in Gotega with an entourage of five trumpeters, five flutists, five hundred men bringing ducks, and sixteen women with golden hatchets and plates. When the Spanish demanded Diriangén and the then subservient chiefs of Nicaragua and Nicoya to be baptized and to renounce their pagan beliefs, Diriangén refused and promised to return in three days. In three days time, he returned with four thousand Dirian and Nagrandano soldiers and forced the Spanish troops to flee southwards. The Spanish regrouped soon after, and destroyed Diriangén's rebel army in less than a day.

Martyrdom 
Diriangén remains a popular figure in Nicaraguan nationalism and anti-colonialism.

See also
Spanish conquest of Nicaragua

References

16th-century Nicaraguan people